Hymenodictyon is a genus of flowering plants in the family Rubiaceae. It has about 30 species. All are native to the Old World. The wood of Hymenodictyon orixense is soft and has limited use, mostly for boxes. The type species for Hymenodictyon is Hymenodictyon orixense (synonym: Hymenodictyon excelsum).

Hymenodictyon was named by Nathaniel Wallich in 1824 in an addendum to William Roxburgh's Flora Indica, in an edition published by Carey and Wallich after Roxburgh's death. The generic name is derived from two Greek words, hymen, "membrane", and diktyon, "net". It refers to the wing that surrounds each seed.

Molecular phylogenetic studies have shown that Hymenodictyon is paraphyletic over the Madagascan genus Paracorynanthe.

In Hymenodictyon and Paracorynanthe, the stipules bear large deciduous glands called colleters. The corolla tube is narrow at the base, gradually widening toward the apex. The fruit is a woody capsule.

Species
, Plants of the World Online accepted the following species:

Hymenodictyon antakaranensis Razafim. & B.Bremer
Hymenodictyon austroafricanum J.E.Burrows & S.M.Burrows
Hymenodictyon berivotrense Cavaco
Hymenodictyon biafranum Hiern
Hymenodictyon decaryi Homolle
Hymenodictyon embergeri Cavaco
Hymenodictyon epiphyticum Razafim. & B.Bremer
Hymenodictyon fimbriolatum K.Schum. ex De Wild.
Hymenodictyon flaccidum Wall.
Hymenodictyon floribundum (Hochst. & Steud.) B.L.Rob.
Hymenodictyon glabrum (Cavaco) Razafim. & B.Bremer
Hymenodictyon horsfieldii Miq.
Hymenodictyon kaokoensis Swanepoel & van Jaarsv.
Hymenodictyon leandrii Cavaco
Hymenodictyon louhavate Homolle
Hymenodictyon madagascaricum Baill. ex Razafim. & B.Bremer
Hymenodictyon obovatum Wall.
Hymenodictyon occidentale Homolle
Hymenodictyon orixense (Roxb.) Mabb.
Hymenodictyon pachyantha K.Krause
Hymenodictyon parvifolium Oliv.
Hymenodictyon perrieri Drake
Hymenodictyon scabrum Stapf
Hymenodictyon septentrionale Cavaco
Hymenodictyon seyrigii Cavaco
Hymenodictyon timoranum (Span.) Miq.
Hymenodictyon tsingy Razafim. & B.Bremer

References

External links
 Hymenodictyon At: Search Page At: World Checklist of Rubiaceae At: Index by Team At: Projects At: Science Directory At: Scientific Research and Data At: Kew Gardens
 Hymenodictyon At:Index Nominum Genericorum At: References At: NMNH Department of Botany At: Research and Collections At: Smithsonian National Museum of Natural History
 Hymenodictyon At: Plant Names At: IPNI
 Flora Indica At: Center for Study of the Life and Work of William Carey At: William Carey University
 CRC World Dictionary of Plant Names: D-L At: Botany & Plant Science At: Life Science At: CRC Press
 Hymenodictyon  At: List of Genera At: Rubiaceae At: List of families At: Families and Genera in GRIN At: Queries At: GRIN taxonomy for plants

Rubiaceae genera
Hymenodictyeae